Seamus G. Bohan was an Irish independent politician. He was a member of Seanad Éireann from 1956 to 1957. He was elected to Seanad at a by-election on 14 May 1956, replacing Andrew Clarkin on the Industrial and Commercial Panel. He did not contest the 1957 Seanad election.

He stood unsuccessfully for Dáil Éireann as an independent candidate in the Dún Laoghaire and Rathdown constituency at the 1961 general election.

References

Year of birth missing
Year of death missing
Independent members of Seanad Éireann
Members of the 8th Seanad
Politicians from County Dublin